Bogdan Achimescu (born 1965 in Timișoara) is a Polish and Romanian visual artist. His work mainly consists of drawings and installations. It explores themes of genetic inheritance, political dystopia and, more recently, imaginary architecture and artifacts.

Through his images, Achimescu "elaborates on human identity through its absence" and mocks established values from a humorous perspective rooted in his nomadic biography. Achimescu represented Romania at the 2001 Venice Biennial as a participant in the Context Network project. He collaborated with the Berlin-based Urban art group on bucharest-buchawork, an artistic project researching transition on the threshold of Romania's accession to the European Union.

Notes

References 
Fejkiel, Jan and Gryglewicz, Tomasz and Wroblewska, Danuta. Polish Printmaking of the Nineties. Warsaw, Poland: Buffi Press, 1996. 
Noyce, Richard. Contemporary Graphic Art in Poland. London: Craftsman House, 1997. 
Ruane, Medb. "Dictatorship is Rubbish". Dublin: Sunday Times, September 2, 2001, p. 1
Iovan, Ioan. Dictionary of Contemporary Artists from Banat. Timișoara, Romania: Editura Brumar, 2003.
Fabini, Dana and Keskrawiec, Marek. "Bogdan Achimescu: I exist in no country". Uglyplaces. Charlottesville, VA: Second Street Gallery, 2005.
Peschken, Anne. "Out There". IDEA art+society, 22, 2005 p. 94-99. ISSN 1583-8293

External links 
Bogdan Achimescu
culturebase.net:Bogdan Achimescu
bucharest-buchawork
The Context Network
N.O.R.W.I.C.H.-The Sainsbury Visual Art Centre
Bogdan Achimescu:Dreams and Confusion, article in IDEA art+society

Artists from Timișoara
Polish artists
1965 births
Living people
20th-century Romanian male artists
21st-century Romanian male artists